Beatrice Roini Liua Faumuina  (born 23 October 1974 in Auckland, New Zealand) is a former New Zealand discus thrower.

Career
Faumuina was a gold medallist at the 1997 World Championships in Athletics. She has represented New Zealand in four Summer Olympics. After winning the discus event at the 2002 Commonwealth Games in Manchester she was featured on a stamp from Samoa. She is currently New Zealand's Trade Commissioner and Consul General, New York.

At the 2004 Summer Olympics she placed 7th in the discus with a throw of 64.45 metres. Early in her career, she was coached by Les Mills, discus gold medallist at the 1966 Commonwealth Games.

In the 2005 Queen's Birthday Honours, Faumuina was appointed an Officer of the New Zealand Order of Merit, for services to athletics. On 16 October 2005, she was nominated Goodwill Ambassador of the Food and Agriculture Organization of the United Nations (FAO).

In 2006, she appeared in the New Zealand version of the television series Dancing with the Stars where she was placed second. Since 2006 she has been a presenter on the Television New Zealand Pacific Islands current events programme Tagata Pasifika. She also attended Lynfield College.

In 2007, Beatrice decided to focus on athletics and based herself in Australia for the majority of the year before competing in Osaka, Japan. She returned to good form after a disappointing injury plagued her 2006 season, placing her 4th at the Melbourne Commonwealth Games. She threw 62.2 metres at a meet in Christchurch, beating rival Dani Samuels from Australia. This followed a winning throw of 62.08 throw at a meet in Canberra.

She placed 28th in the 2008 Summer Olympics in Beijing with a throw of 57.18m, failing to qualify for the final. Her comments to media following her elimination were widely criticized after it was perceived that she was satisfied with what many viewed as a sub-standard performance.

Faumuina finished seventh in the 2009 Reebok Grand Prix in New York, with a throw of 56.73 metres. She was expected to compete in the Prefontaine Classic meet in Oregon, in order to throw the qualifying standard for the 2009 World Championships in Athletics in Berlin. However, she did not attend the meeting and her coach stated that she had decided to focus on her upcoming Bachelor of Business Studies exams instead.

Faumuina has retired from discus throwing.

Achievements

References

External links
Page with Photo, one of two at Sporting Heroes

|-

1974 births
Living people
Olympic athletes of New Zealand
Athletes (track and field) at the 1996 Summer Olympics
Athletes (track and field) at the 2000 Summer Olympics
Athletes (track and field) at the 2004 Summer Olympics
Athletes (track and field) at the 2008 Summer Olympics
New Zealand female discus throwers
Officers of the New Zealand Order of Merit
Athletes from Auckland
Commonwealth Games gold medallists for New Zealand
Commonwealth Games silver medallists for New Zealand
Athletes (track and field) at the 1994 Commonwealth Games
Athletes (track and field) at the 1998 Commonwealth Games
Athletes (track and field) at the 2002 Commonwealth Games
Athletes (track and field) at the 2006 Commonwealth Games
Athletes (track and field) at the 2010 Commonwealth Games
World Athletics Championships medalists
Commonwealth Games medallists in athletics
FAO Goodwill ambassadors
People educated at Lynfield College
Oceanian Athletics Championships winners
World Athletics Championships winners
21st-century New Zealand women
Medallists at the 1994 Commonwealth Games
Medallists at the 1998 Commonwealth Games
Medallists at the 2002 Commonwealth Games